Megachile haematoxylonae is a species of bee in the family Megachilidae.

References

haematoxlyonae
Insects described in 1930